The Selling England by the Pound Tour was a concert tour by the English rock band Genesis, to promote their album Selling England by the Pound. The tour began in September 1973 in the United Kingdom, and ended in May 1974 in the United States.

Background 
Initially the band were to perform with a new and more elaborate stage set than before, that included inflatable objects with projected images, but a change in fire regulations following the Summerland disaster in August 1973 led to the idea being scrapped. Gabriel devised new stories before songs, and wore a full costume with a helmet and shield representing the Britannia character for "Dancing With the Moonlit Knight" and sung "The Battle of Epping Forest" with a stocking over his head.

The tour began with a sold-out tour of the UK, but had to cancel the first date at the Green's Playhouse, Glasgow due to electrical safety issues minutes before its start. The group realised they were substantially in debt and needed better management, so recruited Tony Smith (no relation to Charisma boss Tony Stratton-Smith). In October 1973 a pair of dates in the tour were filmed by Charisma for a possible cinema release, but the plan was rejected by the band who felt the film was not up to standard. Instead, the band performed a five-song set in front of an invited audience at Shepperton Studios that was filmed and broadcast as Tony Stratton-Smith Presents Genesis in Concert. The group returned to the U.S. in December 1973 to perform six shows in three nights at The Roxy in Los Angeles, and a performance of "Watcher of the Skies" and "The Musical Box" on the late-night television show The Midnight Special. January 1974 saw the band perform five nights at Theatre Royal, Drury Lane, at which Gabriel was lifted in the air by a wire during "Supper's Ready".

Setlist 
 "Watcher of the Skies"
 "Dancing with the Moonlit Knight"
 "The Cinema Show"
 "I Know What I Like (In Your Wardrobe)"
 "Firth of Fifth"
 "The Musical Box"
 "More Fool Me" or "Horizons"
 "Supper's Ready"

Other songs that were performed during this tour:
 "The Battle of Epping Forest" (played on 19, 23, 25 September 1973, 11, 19, 20, 21, 23, 26, 28 October 1973, 10, 17, 22 November 1973, 1 December 1973, 13, 19, 20, 30 January 1974, 3, 5, 6 February 1974, 3, 22, 24 March 1974, 7, 17, 18, 20, 21, 22, 29 April 1974, 4, 6 May 1974)
 "The Knife" (played on 6, 9, 12, 19 October 1973, 22 November 1973, 3, 4, 5, 6 February 1974, 22 March 1974)
 "The Return of the Giant Hogweed" (played on 23, 25 September 1973, 12 October 1973)
 "Harold the Barrel" (played on 19, 20, 30, 31 January 1974, 4 February 1974)
 "Can-Utility and the Coastliners" (played on 18 October 1973)
 "Get 'Em Out by Friday" (played on 12 October 1973)
 "Twilight Alehouse" (played on 19 October 1973)

Tour dates

Personnel 
 Peter Gabriel – vocals, flute, percussion
 Tony Banks – Hohner Pianet, RMI Electra Piano, Hammond Organ, Mellotron, ARP Pro Soloist synthesizer, 12-string guitar, backing vocals
 Steve Hackett – electric guitar
 Michael Rutherford – bass, bass pedals, 12-string guitar, electric sitar
 Phil Collins – drums, percussion, backing vocals; lead vocals on "More Fool Me"

References

Citations

Sources
 
 
 
 

Genesis (band) concert tours
1973 concert tours
1974 concert tours